The Nickel-Hopper is a 1926 American short silent comedy film starring Mabel Normand and featuring Oliver Hardy and Boris Karloff in minor uncredited roles.

Cast
 Mabel Normand as Paddy, the nickel hopper
 Michael Visaroff as Paddy's father
 Theodore von Eltz as Jimmy Jessop, Paddy's rich beau
 Jimmy Anderson as Cop
 Margaret Seddon as Paddy's mother
 Mildred Kornman as Edsel
 Hammond Holt as Paddy's little brother (uncredited)
 William Courtright as Mr. Joy, the landlord (uncredited)
 James Finlayson as Rupert, resident of 625 Park St. (uncredited)
 Oliver Hardy as Jazz band drummer (uncredited)
 Boris Karloff as Dance Hall Masher (uncredited)
 Gus Leonard as Blind man (uncredited)
 Sam Lufkin as Dance hall extra (uncredited)

See also
 List of American films of 1926
 Filmography of Oliver Hardy
 Boris Karloff filmography

References

External links

The Nickel-Hopper (1926) at the Internet Archive

1926 films
1926 short films
Silent American comedy films
American silent short films
American black-and-white films
Films directed by F. Richard Jones
Films directed by Hal Yates
American comedy short films
1926 comedy films
1920s American films